The Massachusetts Executive Office of Labor and Workforce Development (EOLWD) is a Cabinet level agency under the Governor of Massachusetts. EOLWD is responsible for enforcing the Commonwealth's labor laws and for providing workforce training to citizens. EOLWD is also responsible for administering Massachusetts' workers' compensation laws, enforcing laws governing collective bargaining, and for providing unemployment benefits to those in need.

The agency is under the supervision and control of the Secretary of Labor and Workforce Development, who is appointed by the Governor.

Leadership
The current Secretary of Labor and Workforce Development is Rosalin Acosta, who was appointed by Governor Charlie Baker in January, 2017.

Mission
The EOLWD missions is to enhance the quality, diversity and stability of Massachusetts' workforce by making available new opportunities and training, protecting the rights of workers, preventing workplace injuries and illnesses, ensuring that businesses are informed of all employment laws impacting them and their employees, providing temporary assistance when employment is interrupted, promoting labor-management partnerships and ensuring equal access to economic self-sufficiency and opportunity for all citizens of the Commonwealth.

Constituent departments
The Office is composed of several Constituent Departments, which are responsible for the administration of the Office's work. Each Department is headed by a Director, who is appointed by the Governor.

Office of the Secretary
Department of Labor Standards 
Department of Industrial Accidents
Department of Labor Relations
Department of Career Services
Department of Unemployment Assistance
Commonwealth Corporation

See also
United States Department of Labor

External links
 
 . (Various documents).

Labor
State departments of labor of the United States